San Ton Mue is a tambon (subdistrict) of Mae Ai District, in Chiang Mai Province, Thailand. In 2020 it had a total population of 6,287 people.

History
The subdistrict was created effective September 14, 1976 by splitting off 7 administrative villages from Mae Na Wang.

Administration

Central administration
The tambon is subdivided into 12 administrative villages (muban).

Local administration
The whole area of the subdistrict is covered by the subdistrict administrative organization (SAO) San Ton Mue (องค์การบริหารส่วนตำบลสันต้นหมื้อ).

References

External links
Thaitambon.com on San Ton Mue

Tambon of Chiang Mai province
Populated places in Chiang Mai province